Brenda Jean Myers–Powell (born April 18, 1957) is an American activist and advocate against human trafficking. Myers–Powell, a human trafficking survivor is the co-founder of The Dreamcatcher Foundation, a nonprofit which aims to fight human trafficking in the Chicago area.

Biography
Myers–Powell was born to a teenage mother and grew up on the west side of Chicago. Her mother died when she was six months old. Myers–Powell was subsequently raised by her alcoholic grandmother. Friends of her grandmother started sexually abusing her when she was four or five years old. Myers–Powell ran away from an abusive home at age 14. By that time she had already given birth to two daughters and her grandmother said that she should bring money in, in order to pay for her children.

Myers–Powell said that she saw prostitutes working on the street and getting paid for what was done to her. So she decided to run away and make money the only way she knew how. Myers–Powell subsequently became a prostitute for 25 years. In June 1973, two pimps abducted her from the Mark Twain Hotel on the Near North Side, raped her and locked her into a hotel room until she agreed to work for them from there on. She tried to escape several times but wasn't able to do so for six months. Later on she was prostituted out by other pimps. She became addicted to drugs and also helped her pimps procure other young girls for the life. Myers Powell was shot at five times and stabbed 13 times by clients during her time as a prostitute.

Myers–Powell left the life as a prostitute after a client almost killed her. After sustaining severe injuries from the client she was treated at County Hospital in Chicago where a doctor advised her to visit the social services at the hospital and she was given the address of Genesis House. Myers–Powell found refuge at Genesis House, which is a safe house for women that are prostituted in the Chicago area. She received job training there and counseling. Myers–Powell credits the head of the safe house, Edwina Gately, with saving her and teaching her on how to be confident.

Activism
Myers–Powell co-founded The Dreamcatcher Foundation (TDF) together with social worker Stephanie Daniels-Wilson in 2008. The organisation wants to fight human trafficking in the Chicago area. TDF prevents trafficking by helping at- risk youth educations and empowerment programs. Kim Longinotto released a documentary, Dreamcatcher, showcasing its work in 2015.

Myers–Powell also is a public speaker on the topic of human trafficking. She testified in front of the Illinois State Senate. She works with Chicago Alliance against sexual exploitation in order to have the criminal records of former prostitutes be expunged. She also wants the responsibility for the crimes to be put on the pimps and johns instead of the prostitutes. She also helps university researchers like Jody Raphael with their field work in the topic of prostitution.

Personal life
Myers–Powell has been married once and has four children, one adopted. Myers–Powell has been married to Keith Powell since 2004. She has three daughters and a son.

References

External links
 website of the dreamcatcher foundation

1957 births
Living people
Human trafficking in the United States
African-American activists
People from Chicago
21st-century African-American people
21st-century African-American women
20th-century American women